José Meltión Chávez (2 July 1957 – 25 May 2021) was an Argentine Roman Catholic bishop.

Biography
Chávez was born in Romero Pozo, Argentina, and was ordained to the priesthood in 1985. He served as bishop of the Roman Catholic Diocese of Añatuya, Argentina, from 2015 to 2019. He then served as coadjutor bishop of the Roman Catholic Diocese of Concepción, Argentina, from 2019 to 2020 and as bishop of the Diocese from 2020 until his death from COVID-19 on 25 May 2021, in San Miguel de Tucumán during the COVID-19 pandemic in Argentina.

Notes

1957 births
2021 deaths
21st-century Roman Catholic bishops in Argentina
Deaths from the COVID-19 pandemic in Argentina
People from Tucumán Province
Roman Catholic bishops of Concepción, Argentina
Roman Catholic bishops of Añatuya